Louis Nathaniel, Baron de Rothschild was an Austrian baron from the famous Rothschild family. He was born in Vienna on 5 March 1882 and died of heart failure while swimming in Montego Bay, Jamaica on 15 January 1955.

Early life 
He was the son of Baron Albert Salomon Anselm von Rothschild and Bettina Caroline de Rothschild (1858–1892). He owned a spectacular palace in Vienna, the Palais Rothschild, that housed an exquisite art collection and antiques.

Banker 
After the death of his father, Albert Rothschild, in 1911, he took over the management of the Creditanstalt bank and industrial companies owned by the Austrian branch of the Rothschilds.

Held for ransom by Nazis 
After the Anschluß of Austria to Nazi Germany in March 1938, he was arrested at the airport at Aspern and held for ransom by the Nazis. He was released only after lengthy negotiations between the family and the Nazis and upon payment of $21,000,000, believed to have been the largest bail bond in history for any individual.

While imprisoned he was visited by Heinrich Himmler. Rothschild apparently impressed the SS leader, who subsequently ordered that Rothschild's prison conditions be improved with better furniture and sanitation facilities. Despite appeals from Queen Mary of the United Kingdom and possibly the Duke of Windsor, Rothschild was held in Vienna's Hotel Metropole while the German government attempted to expropriate his business concerns. He was imprisoned at least through July 1938, and his property placed under control of a German "commissioner". Felix Somary, in his memoirs, recalls that, soon before the Anschluss, he phoned to the baron repeatedly, in a desperate attempt to convince him to leave Austria. The day before the Anschluss, Louis's brother Alphons and his wife were visiting him in Switzerland, wanting to go back into Austria; he persuaded them to remain there, and to get his children Francesca de Rothschild and Heidi de Rothschild away from Austria to the Netherlands.

Finally allowed to leave Austria, Louis survived the Holocaust and Second World War.

Aryanisations and seizures 
All of the Rothschild possessions were plundered and subsequently "Aryanised". The city-palace of the family was destroyed after the war. The baron never received most of his former belongings back, since most of the paintings were taken over by the Austrian state, which did not allow the paintings to leave the country. In 1998, over 200 art works were returned to the Rothschild heirs by the Austrian Government, and were placed at Christie's in London for auction in 1999.

Personal life 
In 1946 he married the Countess Hildegarde Karoline Johanna Maria von Auersperg (1895–1981), the only daughter of Count Anton von Auersperg (1858-1924) and his wife Valerie Schenk von Lédecz (1875-1931). They lived in East Barnard, Vermont (United States) and England. He died childless in 1955.

Postwar 
In 2020, in one of the largest ever restitution claims filed, Rothschild heirs sued Vienna over a trust seized by Nazis.

See also 

 Aryanization
 Anschluss
 The Holocaust in Austria
Hitler's Führermuseum in Linz
Rothschild family

Notes

External links
 AEIOU |Louis Nathaniel Freiherr von Rothschild
 Die Rothschild'schen Gemäldesammlungen in Wien, register of Louis and Alphonse Rothschild's art collection seized by the Nazis, on OAPEN Foundation

Louis Nathaniel
Austrian bankers
1882 births
1955 deaths
Jewish emigrants from Austria after the Anschluss
Jewish art collectors